The 179th Ohio Infantry Regiment, sometimes 179th Ohio Volunteer Infantry (or 179th OVI) was an infantry regiment in the Union Army during the American Civil War.

Service
The 179th Ohio Infantry was organized at Camp Chase in Columbus, Ohio, and mustered in for one year service on September 29, 1864, under the command of Colonel Harley H. Sage.

The regiment was attached to Post of Nashville, Tennessee, Department of the Cumberland, to December 1864. 2nd Brigade, 4th Division, XX Corps, Department of the Cumberland, to March 1865. Post of Nashville to June 1865.

The 179th Ohio Infantry mustered out of service June 18, 1865, at Nashville, Tennessee.

Detailed service
Ordered to Nashville, Tennessee, arriving there October 8. Engaged in post and garrison duty at Nashville, Tenn., October 1864 to June 1865. Battle of Nashville December 15–16, 1864.

Casualties
The regiment lost a total of 80 enlisted men during service, all due to disease.

Commanders
 Colonel Harley H. Sage

See also

 List of Ohio Civil War units
 Ohio in the Civil War

References
 Dyer, Frederick H. A Compendium of the War of the Rebellion (Des Moines, IA:  Dyer Pub. Co.), 1908.
 Ohio Roster Commission. Official Roster of the Soldiers of the State of Ohio in the War on the Rebellion, 1861–1865, Compiled Under the Direction of the Roster Commission (Akron, OH: Werner Co.), 1886–1895.
 Reid, Whitelaw. Ohio in the War: Her Statesmen, Her Generals, and Soldiers (Cincinnati, OH: Moore, Wilstach, & Baldwin), 1868. 
Attribution

External links
 Ohio in the Civil War: 179th Ohio Volunteer Infantry by Larry Stevens
 National flag of the 179th Ohio Infantry 
 Regimental flag of the 179th Ohio Infantry
 Guidon of the 179th Ohio Infantry

Military units and formations established in 1864
Military units and formations disestablished in 1865
Units and formations of the Union Army from Ohio
1864 establishments in Ohio